KJHM (101.5 MHz) is a commercial FM radio station licensed to Watkins, Colorado, and serving the Denver metropolitan area.  It is owned by Max Media and airs an urban adult contemporary format branded as "Jammin' 101.5".  Its studios are located on Parker Road in Aurora.

KJHM's signal isn't as strong in Downtown Denver, or in the western suburbs (Arvada, Lakewood, and Wheat Ridge); because of this, there is a 20,000 watt co-channel booster station in Commerce City, KJHM-1-FM, which helps the signal reach closer to Denver.

History

KBRU (1968-2006)
KJHM was originally KBRU at 101.7 MHz, licensed to Fort Morgan.  It had an adult contemporary format.  It later switched its city of license to Strasburg, Colorado and moved its dial position to 101.5 MHz.

Adult standards (2006-2008)
The station was branded as "101.5 Martini On The Rockies" as KTNI, airing an adult standards format.

Modern rock (2008-2009) 
In February 2008, it became "Indie" with a modern rock format. When the station changed, they used an on-air clicking sound effect of an iPod being randomly selected to play a song supposedly on the station's music playlist, to suggest the next song could be anything that was available on the device. This approach was used for a couple of months until it lost popularity with listeners.

According to FCC filings, the station's owner (KBRU-FM, LLC - a subsidiary of Denver Radio Company) sought bankruptcy protection in February 2008 and has since emerged from bankruptcy.

On January 16, 2009, the debtor in possession for Denver Radio Company received permission to operate the station temporarily without a main studio within 25 miles of the community of license, which is a requirement for all commercial radio stations.  It planned to run the station from studios also used by KONN in Aurora, Colorado.

Talk (2009-2010) 
The station was sold to Max Media in 2009.  Upon the completion of the sale, on July 31, 2009, at 9 a.m., KTNI dropped the alternative rock format, which moved online as Indie303.com, and began a week-long stunt with a "stripper format", calling itself "The Pole." The stunt was sponsored by local strip club Shotgun Willie's. At 4 p.m. on August 6, KTNI flipped to conservative talk as "101.5 The Truth."

The Truth was among Denver's lowest rated stations, according to Arbitron's PPM rating service. Local paid programming included "Green Rights Radio", "Lacrosse Talk" (which is believed to be the only radio show dedicated to the sport), "real talk 360" and "Zinna". It carried much of Talk Radio Network's programming lineup, including The Phil Hendrie Show, the alleged cult leader Roy Masters, Mancow's Morning Madhouse, Jerry Doyle, The Savage Nation, and Rusty Humphries. Tape-delayed broadcasts of Neal Boortz, Curtis Sliwa and Phil Valentine completed the station's weekday lineup.

Rhythmic oldies (2010-2012)
On September 3, 2010, at 4 p.m., KTNI changed its format to Rhythmic Oldies/Urban Oldies as "Jammin' 101.5." The first song on "Jammin'" was "Jam On It" by Newcleus. This was the second time the format and moniker had been used in the market. The first time was from May 1999 to December 2005, when it was on KDJM (now KKSE-FM). In November 2010, the station brought back former KDJM afternoon DJ Cha Cha to host mornings, as well as adding afternoon personality "SLiM" (formerly of KMEL/San Francisco). The station used jingles formerly heard on KPTT during its run as a Rhythmic AC station.

On September 23, 2010, KTNI's call letters were changed to KJHM-FM to reflect the "Jammin'" moniker.

R&B (2012-2015)
In late June 2012, KJHM shifted from a Rhythmic Oldies format to a mix of Urban Adult Contemporary and Urban Oldies as "The New Jammin' 101.5, True Old School and Smooth R&B", under the direction of veteran programmer Mike Marino, formerly of KHHT/Los Angeles. Marino was quick to say KJHM plays R&B hits and classics for a mass-appeal audience who grew up listening to that music.

Rhythmic AC (2015-2016)
On October 1, 2015, at 5 p.m., KJHM shifted to a Rhythmic AC format, dropping the 1960s, 1970s and 1980s songs, and refocusing the playlist on 1990s rhythmic hits, 2000s rhythmic/pop songs, and current/recurrent rhythmic/pop titles.  The change was made due to the results of a listener survey posted on the website.  KJHM also changed its slogan to "The Next Generation."

Rhythmic oldies (2016-2022)

On March 18, 2016, KJHM reverted to Rhythmic oldies. The station's second go-around with the format included the return of 1970s and 1980s tracks (along with less neo-soul and more disco), while retaining some 1990s and 2000s rhythmic/R&B tracks, as well as some re-currents and currents held over from the previous format. The change was made due to poor ratings.

Shift to Urban AC (2022-Present)
By 2022, some newer songs were added in to the playlist, making KJHM a rhythmic oldies-leaning Rhythmic AC station. On January 9, 2023, alongside additions to its on-air lineup, the station adopted the new slogan "The Mile High Vibe".

References

External links

Indie303.com (webcast successor to "Indie 101.5" operated by Max Media)

Rhythmic oldies radio stations in the United States
JHM
Adams County, Colorado
Morgan County, Colorado
Radio stations established in 1968
Max Media radio stations
1968 establishments in Colorado